Gutenzell-Hürbel is a town in the district of Biberach in Baden-Württemberg in Germany.

Gutenzell developed out of Gutenzell Abbey, a Cistercian nunnery founded in 1237.

References

Biberach (district)
Württemberg